Events in the year 935 in Japan.

Incumbents
Monarch: Suzaku

Events
January 28 - Provincial governor Ki no Tsurayuki begins writing the Tosa Diary, describing his return to Kyōto. (Traditional Japanese Date: Twenty-first Day of the Twelfth Month, 934)

References

935
10th century in Japan